Keystone beer is a product of the Molson Coors Beverage Company in Golden, Colorado.  It was first introduced in Chico, California in September 1989. Keystone Ice can be found in canned, kegged, and occasionally, bottled form, with 5.9% ABV. Keystone Light has a 4.13% ABV; roughly equal to other macro "light" brews.  Keystone is a primary sponsor for Austin Cindric’s number 2 car in the NASCAR Cup Series.

Varieties
Six varieties of Keystone have been produced, as well as the original:

 Keystone, introduced 1989, found with a gold can, red label, later changed to Keystone Premium
 Keystone Premium, found with a red, white and blue can
 Keystone Light, introduced 1989, found with a blue label
 Keystone Dry, introduced 1991, found with a black can, red label
 Keystone Ice, introduced 1994, "ice brewed ale," found with a black label.
 Keystone Amber Light, introduced 1994, found with a gold can with a diamond "Amber Light" badge
 Keystone V9, Puerto Rico only.
 Keystone Lime, introduced in Stauffer West during 2013.
 Keystone Light Keylightful, introduced March 1, 2020 in 40 US States. Raspberry - Lime 

The "Light" and "Ice" versions of the beer are far more prevalent and readily available for retail across the United States. Though Keystone Premium exists, it appears much less than its "Light" variety on liquor store shelves. "Dry" and "Amber Light" varieties were discontinued in the late 90s.

Recently, a new variety of Keystone, V9, has been introduced to Puerto Rico by a licensed distributor there, V. Suárez & Co. Inc., of Guaynabo, intended to be sold cheaply. The can is black with a blue "V9" and is labeled as 5.9% alc./vol.

In the province of Ontario (and most of Canada), Keystone Light is available in bottles, cans, and tall cans at 4.0% A.B.V. and featuring a 'near-discount' price.

Nutrition information

Marketing
The advertising slogan in 2007 for Keystone was "Always Smooth, Even When You're Not."  The official slogan was formerly "All Stones Must Be Thrown", and it was marketed as "bottled beer taste in a can" (due, according to Coors, to their use of specially lined cans). Another slogan used for Keystone Light called it the "Never Bitter Beer", with commercials touting it as a remedy for "Bitter Beer Face".
 The commercial theme in the early 90s was "Wouldn't it be great if..." followed by beer-drinker fantasies, concluding with "and they served beer, really great beer like Keystone and Keystone Lite—bottled beer taste in a can."
 In promotion of Keystone Light, Coors Brewing Company has created a fictitious character named Keith Stone. Keith Stone has appeared in numerous television spots promoting Keystone Light, where he dials a phone with beef jerky.  The advertisements involving Keith Stone have inspired many customers to make spoof advertisements for distribution on the Internet.
 In 2011, Coors Brewing Company, in promotion of its product Keystone Light, re-engineered its 30-pack cases to allow its purchasers to play a modified game of Cornhole, a popular lawn game.  The brewer rebranded its boxes to promote the game of "Canhole".
 March 1, 2020 Launch of Keylightful Raspberry-Lime infused Keystone Light attempt to lure younger, legal age drinkers. Marketing launch will feature a Sun-glass wearing French bulldog clad in a "Hawaiian" style shirt. Mascot name is Lil' Breezy Keezy

References

External links
Official Keystone Light Home Page
Coors Brewing Home Page 
Keystone and other Coors product's nutritional information
V. Suárez & Co., Inc.

Molson Coors brands
Products introduced in 1989